Qiaoxiang station is a station of Shenzhen Metro Line 2. It opened on 28 June 2011. It is located nearby the Qiaoxiang Road.

Station layout

Exits

References

External links
 Shenzhen Metro Qiaoxiang Station (Chinese)
 Shenzhen Metro Qiaoxiang Station (English)

Shenzhen Metro stations
Railway stations in Guangdong
Futian District
Railway stations in China opened in 2011